Hymns for the Exiled is the second studio album by American folksinger Anaïs Mitchell, released in 2004 on Waterbug Records.  It was recorded at The Gristmill in Bristol, Vermont, and produced by Michael Chorney.

Track listing
 Before the Eyes of Storytelling Girls
 1984
 Cosmic American
 The Belly and the Beast
 Orion
 Mockingbird
 I Wear Your Dress
 Quecreek Flood
 A Hymn for the Exiled
 Two Kids
 One Good Thing

References

Anaïs Mitchell albums
2004 albums